Nadie Como Tu may refer to:

Music

Albums
Nadie Como Tú, 1990 album by Paloma San Basilio
Nadie Como Tú, 1994 album by Mazz

Songs
"Nadie Como Tu" (Leslie Grace song), 2014
"Nadie Como Tú", song by Paloma San Basilio from the album
"Nadie Como Tú", song by Mazz from the album
"Nadie Como Tú", 1995 song by Kiara
"Nadie Como Tú", 1998 song by Chayanne from the album Atado a Tu Amor
"Nadie Como Tú", 2007 song by Wisin & Yandel from the album Los Vaqueros Wild Wild Mixes
"No Hay Nadie Como Tú", 2008 song by Calle 13